Edwin Napper (26 January 1815 – 8 March 1895) was an English amateur cricketer who played first-class cricket from 1839 to 1862.

A left-handed batsman and right arm medium pace roundarm bowler who was mainly associated with Sussex, he made 128 known appearances in first-class matches. He was the second Sussex club captain, succeeding C. G. Taylor before the 1847 season and holding the post until 1862.  He represented the Gentlemen in the Gentlemen v Players series and the South in the North v. South series.

Napper subsequently became a "most enthusiastic and generous patron of the game". His brother, William, also played first-class cricket.

References

1815 births
1895 deaths
English cricketers
English cricketers of 1826 to 1863
Gentlemen cricketers
Sussex cricketers
Sussex cricket captains
North v South cricketers
Petworth cricketers
Gentlemen of the South cricketers
Surrey Club cricketers
Married v Single cricketers
Gentlemen of England cricketers
Gentlemen of Kent and Sussex cricketers
All-England Eleven cricketers